Antoni Ponikowski (May 29, 1878 – December 27, 1949) was a Polish academician and politician who served as 7th Prime Minister of Poland in 1918 and from 1921 to 1922.

1878 births
1949 deaths
People from Siedlce
People from Siedlce Governorate
National League (Poland) members
National-Democratic Party (Poland) politicians
Polish Christian Democratic Party politicians
Prime Ministers of Poland
Government ministers of Poland
People of the Kingdom of Poland (1917–1918)
Members of the Sejm of the Second Polish Republic (1930–1935)
Polish anti-communists
Burials at Powązki Cemetery